David H. Abell (c. 1807 – March 1872 Groveland, Livingston County, New York) was an American politician from New York.

Life
He lived for some time at Mount Morris.

He was a New York State Canal Appraiser from 1848 to 1850; and a member of the New York State Senate (30th D.) in 1860 and 1861.

In January 1869, he was appointed by President Andrew Johnson as U.S. Tax Assessor for the 25th District of New York.

Sources
 The New York Civil List compiled by Franklin Benjamin Hough, Stephen C. Hutchins and Edgar Albert Werner (1867; pg. 407 and 442)
 Biographical Sketches of the State Officers and Members of the Legislature of the State of New York by William D. Murphy (1861; pg. 34ff)
 WASHINGTON; ...NOMINATIONS BY THE PRESIDENT in NYT on January 13, 1869
 Obit in the Corning Journal on March 21, 1872

1807 births
1872 deaths
People from Groveland, New York
Republican Party New York (state) state senators
People from Mount Morris, New York
19th-century American politicians